Man and the Planets: The Resources of the Solar System is a book written by Duncan Lunan.

Contents
Man and the Planets is a book published in 1983 which studies the resources of each planet in the solar system.

Reception
Dave Langford reviewed Man and the Planets for White Dwarf #41, and stated that "Lunan's enthusiasm is infectious, his research exhaustive; he's absolutely committed to the Dream of Space and has no time for the many equally learned people who fear that the expense of opening up this new frontier would wreck our world economy long before producing tangible benefits."

Reviews
Review by Tom Easton (1983) in Analog Science Fiction/Science Fact, November 1983

References

Astronomy books